Byron Ray Hunt (born December 17, 1958) is a former professional American football linebacker in the National Football League (NFL) for the New York Giants. He played high school football for the White Oak Roughnecks in White Oak, Texas. He played college football at Southern Methodist University and was drafted in the ninth round of the 1981 NFL Draft.

He is the younger brother of former New England Patriots linebacker Sam Hunt.

References

1958 births
Living people
People from Longview, Texas
American football linebackers
SMU Mustangs football players
New York Giants players

External Links